Inner City Front is the eleventh full-length album by Canadian singer/songwriter Bruce Cockburn, released in 1981 by True North Records.

Reception

In a retrospective review, Allmusic critic Brett Hartenbach wrote, "Musically, moody synths, violin, and woodwinds on Inner City Front underscore the dark, reflective nature of the material, which like its predecessor, deals with the "paradox and contrast" in the human condition, from personal relationships to world affairs. Also, for the second consecutive recording, Cockburn eschews the folkier, acoustic leanings of his '70s work and places both feet squarely into the jazz and worldbeat rock that dominated the majority of Humans."

Track listing
All songs written by Bruce Cockburn.

"You Pay Your Money and You Take Your Chance"
"The Strong One"
"All's Quiet on the Inner City Front"
"Radio Shoes"
"Wanna Go Walking"
"And We Dance"
"Justice"
"Broken Wheel"
"Loner"

Personnel
Bruce Cockburn – vocals, dulcimer, guitar
Bob Disalle – drums
Memo Acevedo – percussion
Ruholla Khomeini – percussion
Jon Goldsmith – keyboards
Dennis Pendrith – bass
Hugh Marsh – mandolin, violin
M. Kaddafi – backing vocals
Murray McLauchlan – backing vocals
Kathryn Moses – reeds, woodwinds, backing vocals

Production
Bruce Cockburn – producer
Bernie Finkelstein – associate producer
Gary Gray – engineer
George Marino – mastering
Bart Schoales – art Direction, photography
George Whiteside – photography

Charts

References

1981 albums
Bruce Cockburn albums
True North Records albums